Nissan Motors operates a proving ground in Motegi, Haga District, Tochigi Prefecture, Japan.  The track includes an off-road facility for testing trucks and SUVs.  The  

is located at 555 Aida-Ōaza, Haga-gun, Motegi.  The track was built by Tobishima Corporation  and completed in 1997.

References

Road test tracks by manufacturer
Buildings and structures in Tochigi Prefecture
Nissan
Motegi, Tochigi